The 2015 season is the Houston Dash's second season as a professional women's soccer team. As a member of the National Women's Soccer League, United States' top-flight women's league, the Dash's schedule includes 20 total games (10 home, 10 away) against eight other NWSL teams. The Dash look to make the playoffs for the first time in franchise history after finishing in last place during their inaugural season. The 2015 regular season began on April 10, 2015.

Background

College draft
The Houston Dash selected University of Virginia and U.S. Women's National Team midfielder Morgan Brian with the first overall pick in the 2015 NWSL College Draft. The Dash also traded away the 13th overall pick in the 2015 draft and a second round pick in the 2016 College Draft to Portland Thorns FC for a player to be named later.

Preseason

Colours: Green = Houston Dash win; Yellow = draw; Red = opponents win.

Season review

April
The new-look Houston Dash kicked off the year's NWSL action with a 2-0 win over the Washington Spirit at BBVA Compass Stadium. Offseason acquisition Carli Lloyd scored the opening goal in first half stoppage time, and last season's club top goalscorer Kealia Ohai put away the second goal five minutes into the second half. The Dash looked revamped in attack and, defensively, collected their first shutout of the season.

Club

Coaching staff
{| class="wikitable"
|-
!Position
!Staff
|-
|Head Coach|| Randy Waldrum
|-
|Assistant coach ||  Marcelo Galvao
|-
|Assistant coach ||  Hiro Suzuki
|-
|Goalkeeper coach||  Tom Brown
|-
|Athletic Trainer ||  Kristy Chavez
|-
|Massage Therapist ||  Wes Speights
|-

Other information

 Gabriel Brener
|-
||President of Business Operations|| Chris Canetti 
|-

Squad
The following is a list of players who were under contract with the Houston Dash at any point during the 2015 season.

Standings and match results

National Women's Soccer League

League standings

Results summary

Results by matchday

Matches

Awards

NWSL Player of the Month

NWSL Player of the Week

Squad statistics
Source: NWSL

Key to positions: FW - Forward, MF - Midfielder, DF - Defender, GK - Goalkeeper

Notes

References

Houston Dash seasons
Houston Dash
Houston Dash
Houston Dash